General Staats Long Morris (27 August 1728 – 28 January 1800) was a British Army officer and politician who sat in the House of Commons representing the constituency of Elgin Burghs  from 1774 to 1784. He also served as governor of Quebec from 1797 until his death. Born in the colony of New York, Morris parlayed a marriage to a Scottish noblewoman into a successful career as a military officer and politician in the British Parliament. 

Born on 1728 in the town of Morrisania, New York, Morris graduated from Yale College in 1746 before embarking on a military career, serving as an army officer in the New York Independent Companies. A protege of British colonial official William Shirley, a journey with him to England in 1756 led Morris to meet and marry the widowed Catherine Gordon, Duchess of Gordon, who significantly advanced her husband's career in the British Army. 

After serving in India from 1762 to 1763 during the Seven Years' War, Morris focused his attentions on American affairs, receiving  of land grants in Canada. Morris also began to develop a political career, entering Parliament in 1774 thanks to a friendship with the 4th Duke of Gordon. When war broke out between Britain and its North American colonies in 1776, Morris, a Loyalist, avoided service in North America. 

His wife died in 1779, and Morris remarried a year later. In 1796, Morris was promoted to the rank of general, and was given the governorship of Quebec in the next year. The position was a sinecure and Morris remained in England while holding the governorship, which he continued to do until his death in office at the age of 71. After his death, Morris was buried in Westminster Abbey, one of the few Americans to be accorded such an honor.

Early life

Staats Long Morris was born on 27 August, 1728, in the town of Morrisania, New York. His father, Lewis Morris Jr., was a politician, judge and landowner who served as the speaker of the New York General Assembly from 1737 to 1738 and sat on the High Court of the Admiralty of New York from 1737 to 1762. Morris' mother was Katryntje (also known as Tryntje) Staats, who was the daughter of New Amsterdam doctor Samuel Staats.

Morris was sent by his father to study at Yale College in Connecticut alongside his brothers Richard and Lewis, entering the college in 1743 and graduating three years later in 1746. The same year that he graduated, Morris' grandfather Lewis, who served as governor of New Jersey from 1738 to 1746, died. His father remarried to Sarah Gouverneur in the same year as well (Katryntje had died in 1731, when Morris was three years old).

After graduating from Yale, Morris enlisted in the British Army, rising to the rank of lieutenant in the New York Independent Companies. When the royal governor of Massachusetts, William Shirley, raised the 50th Regiment of Foot in 1754 during the French and Indian War, Morris was placed in command of the regiment's companies. When Shirley became Commander-in-Chief, North America, Morris served as one of his aides-de-camp.

Career in Britain and India

In 1749, Shirley was temporarily recalled to Great Britain, and Morris followed him there as well. While staying in Britain, Morris met and eventually married widowed Scottish noblewoman Catherine Gordon, Duchess of Gordon, the widow of Cosmo Gordon, 3rd Duke of Gordon, on 25 March 1756. As noted by British historians Lewis Namier and John Brooke, the Duchess had been searching for a eligible bachelor "for some time."

At the time of their marriage, Morris was only at the rank of captain in the British Army and ten years her junior, which according to English historian Stephen Conway "raised [eyebrows] in polite society". After marrying the Duchess, Morris made a brief visit to North America before returning to Britain on November 1759, settling down in his wife's personal residence of Gordon Castle and establishing himself as the consort of the Duchess.

The marriage led to Morris acquiring significant political influence, rising to the rank of major two years later.  In 1759, the Duchess persuaded King George II to allow Morris to raise a Highland regiment in the traditional territories of the Clan Gordon, a region she was familiar with. This was done as a means of both advancing her husband's military career and countering the political influence of the Argyll family (vis-à-vis the Gordon family).

Recruitment efforts for the new regiment, spurred on by the reputation of the Duchess, were so successful that within a few weeks 960 recruits had been assembled at Gordon Castle. In December 1759, the recruits marched from the castle to Aberdeen, where they were organised into the 89th Regiment of Foot. Morris, who had been promoted to the rank of lieutenant-colonel, was made the regiment's commander and held control over the distribution of commissions. Fellow military officer Hector Munro, 8th Laird of Novar served under him in the regiment at the rank of major.

To the dismay of the Duchess, the regiment was ordered to sail to India as part of the Seven Years' War, embarking on November 1761. Morris himself did not leave England until April 1762, when he finally travelled to India and joined his regiment, which was stationed in the Bombay Presidency. The regiment was described by Scottish historian Frank Adam as "having acquitted itself in a most exemplary manner" during its existence. On December 1763, Morris returned to England, and his regiment followed him in the next year, before being disbanded in 1765.

Later life and death

After the Seven Years' War, Morris revived his interest in North American affairs, applying for land grants in East Florida, Nova Scotia and Quebec in 1765; he was granted  in Canada in 1766. In 1768, Morris toured North America alongside his wife, visiting Pennsylvania and New York. Returning to Scotland in 1769, his friendship with the 4th Duke of Gordon helped Morris to be elected to the House of Commons, representing Elgin Burghs from 1774 to 1784.

When the Revolutionary War broke out between Britain and the Patriots in 1776, Morris, a Loyalist, offered to resign, but the War Office in London instead assigned him to the British garrison on the island of Minorca "so that he would not be forced to fight on his native soil." Morris was promoted to the rank of major-general in 1777, and made an application to command the 50th Regiment of Foot, which was unsuccessful despite being supported by incumbent Prime Minister Lord North.

In the same year, Morris was appointed as the commander of the 61st Regiment of Foot. In Parliament, Morris was absent from votes on numerous proposed bills, which led King George III to instruct Jeffery Amherst, 1st Baron Amherst to write to Morris insisting that he attend parliament more frequently.  Persuaded by Amherst, Morris increased his attendance in Parliament, becoming a strong supporter of the North ministry. In the 1780 general election, Morris successfully kept his seat. 

After his wife died in 1779, Morris remarried to Jane Urquhart in 1780. Morris remarrying so soon led relations between him and the 4th Duke of Gordon to quickly deteriorate, and by 1788 Morris was said to be "at variance with the Duke". Upon Sarah Gouvernour's death in 1786, Morris inherited her family estate, which had been partially damaged by British forces during the American Revolution. Expressing no interest in the property, Morris quickly sold it to his half-brother, Gouverneur.

In 1796, Morris was promoted to the rank of general, and was appointed governor of Quebec the next year, succeeding General James Johnston. The position was a sinecure and Morris remained in England while holding the position, which he continued to do until his death in office three years later on April 2, 1800 at the age of 71. The governership of Quebec was succeeded by Major-General William Goodday Strutt. Morris' corpse was eventually interred in Westminster Abbey, one of the few Americans to be accorded such an honor.

Personal life, family and legacy

Morris was born into a prominent Anglo-American colonial family whose members had long been influential in the English colonization of both New York and New Jersey. However, the American Revolutionary War divided the members of the Morris family, though American historian Richard Brookhiser has noted that Morris was the only member of his family to support the Loyalist cause; his brothers all supported the Patriots, with Richard resigning from his position as a judge during the American Revolution rather than continue to serve under a British colonial administration. 

Though his marriage to the Duchess initially proved to be controversial among British high society, according to a 1781 edition of the English Chronicle, Morris "conducted himself in this new exaltation with so much moderation, affability and friendship that the family soon forgot the degradation the Duchess had been guilty of by such a connexion , and received her spouse into their perfect favour and esteem." Morris was also the stepfather of infamous politician Lord George Gordon, famous for his role in initiating and leading the anti-Catholic Gordon Riots of 1780.

After his father's death, Morris received half of his estate, which partially consisted of extensive landholdings in Westchester County, New York. As noted by historian William Howard Adams, his stepmother Sarah was only given a life interest in Morris' half of his father's estate due to distrust from her stepsons Lewis and Richard, who prevented her from receiving an increased share of her late husband's estate. When she died in 1789, the life interest passed to Morris, who eventually sold it to Gouverneur along with the New York landholdings he had received from his father.

Not soon after Morris died on 2 April 1800, his wife Jane died on 15 March 1801 at the age of 52; she was buried alongside him in Westminster Abbey. The original full-sized gravestone for the couple was replaced by a "very small and barely legible" replacement stone following the repaving of the Westminster Abbey nave in 1834 which only mentions Jane and not Morris. English historian Tony Willoughby speculates that a similar replacement stone was installed for Morris, though he also noted that as of 2018 any such stone was not present in Westminster Abbey.

References

Footnotes

Books

External links
 Portrait of Catherine Gordon from Art UK

|-

1728 births
1800 deaths
18th-century British North American people
British America army officers
British Army personnel of the Seven Years' War
British Army generals
British MPs 1774–1780
British MPs 1780–1784
Burials at Westminster Abbey
Gloucestershire Regiment officers
Loyalists in the American Revolution from New York (state)
Members of the Parliament of Great Britain for Scottish constituencies
Morris family (Morrisania and New Jersey)
People of New York in the French and Indian War
People of the Province of New York
Politicians from the Thirteen Colonies
Yale College alumni